The Merikins or Merikens were African-American Marines of the War of 1812 – former African slaves who fought for the British against the US in the Corps of Colonial Marines and then, after post-war service in Bermuda, were established as a community in the south of Trinidad in 1815–1816.  They were settled in an area populated by French-speaking Catholics and retained cohesion as an English-speaking, Baptist community. It is sometimes said that the term "Merikins" derived from the local patois, but as many Americans have long been in the habit of dropping the initial "A" it seems more likely that the new settlers brought that pronunciation with them from the United States. Some of the Company villages and land grants established back then still exist in Trinidad today.

Origin

During the American Revolution, the British recruited freedmen for service as Colonial Marines. During the War of 1812, there was a policy that was somewhat similar except that freedmen were treated as free as soon as they came into British hands and there were no conditions nor bargains attached to recruitment. Six companies of freedmen were recruited into a Corps of Colonial Marines along the Atlantic coast, from Chesapeake Bay to Georgia.After that war, the British settled these Colonial Marines in British Empire colonies including Canada, Jamaica, and the Bahamas. 

Vice Admiral Sir Alexander Cochrane, on taking over the command of British forces on the North America station on 2 April 1814, issued a proclamation offering a choice of enlistment or resettlement:

Cochrane's recruitment of the Colonial Marines, mostly in the Chesapeake, went doubly against his orders from the British government, who had instructed him to accept volunteers for military service only from Georgia and South Carolina and to send all such volunteers away immediately for training overseas for the Army.

After the end of the War, the Colonial Marines were first stationed at the Royal Naval Dockyard, Bermuda. Although they had signed on for a military life, they rejected government orders to be transferred to the West India Regiments, and finally agreed to be settled in Trinidad and Tobago.

The Governor of Trinidad, Sir Ralph Woodford, wanted to increase the number of small farmers in that colony and arranged for the creation of a village for each company on the Naparima Plain in the south of the island. Local planter Robert Mitchell managed the establishment and maintenance of the settlements, petitioning the governor for supplies when needed.

Company villages

There were 574 former soldiers plus about 200 women and children. To balance the sexes, more black women were subsequently recruited – women who had been freed from other places such as captured French slave ships. The six companies were each settled in a separate village under the command of a corporal or sergeant, who maintained a military style of discipline. Some of the villages were named after the companies and the Fifth and Sixth Company villages still retain those names.

The villages were in a forested area of the Naparima Plain near a former Spanish mission, La Misión de Savana Grande.  Each of the Veteran Marines were granted 16 acres of land and some of these plots are still farmed today by descendants of original settlers. The land was fertile but the conditions were primitive initially as the land had to be cleared and the lack of roads was an especial problem.  It is sometimes said that some of the settlers were craftsmen more used to an urban environment and, as they had been expecting better, they were disgruntled and some returned to America, but this comment applies to later free Black American settlers, who came from towns, and not to the Veteran Colonial Marines, who were all refugees from the rural areas of the Chesapeake and Georgia. The settlers built houses from the timber they felled, and planting crops of bananas, cassava, maize and potatoes.  Rice was introduced from America and was especially useful because it could be stored for long periods without spoiling.

Twenty years after the initial establishment, the then governor Lord Harris supported improvements to the infrastructure of the settlements and arranged for the settlers to get deeds to their lands, so confirming their property rights as originally stated on arrival, though it is not clear that the initiative was carried through universally.  As they prospered, they became a significant element in Trinidad's economy.  Their agriculture advanced from subsistence farming to include cash crops of cocoa and sugar cane.  Later, oil was discovered and then some descendants were able to lease their lands for the mineral rights.  Others continued as independent market traders.

Religion

Many of the original settlers were Baptists from evangelical sects common in places such as Georgia and Virginia.  The settlers kept this religion, which was reinforced by missionary work by Baptists from London who helped organise the construction of churches in the 1840s.  The villages had pastors and other religious elders as authority figures and there was a rigorous moral code of abstinence and the puritan work ethic.  African traditions were influential too and these included the   system of communal help, herbal medicine and Obeah – African tribal science.  A prominent elder in the 20th century was "Papa Neezer" – Samuel Ebenezer Elliot (1901–1969) – who was a descendant of an original settler, George Elliot, and renowned for his ability to heal and cast out evil spirits.  His syncretic form of religion included veneration of Shango, prophecies from the "Obee seed" and revelation from the Psalms. The Spiritual Baptist faith is a legacy of the Merikin community.

Famous Merikins

The following people are descended from this community:
Tina Dunkley, American museum director
Hazel Manning, Trinidadian senator and education minister
Althea McNish, British textile designer
Brent Sancho, footballer, Minister for Sport for Trinidad and Tobago
Lincoln Crawford OBE, barrister, Chair, Independent Adoption Service

See also

 Black Refugee (War of 1812) – similar communities established in the Canadian provinces of Nova Scotia and New Brunswick.

Citations and references

Citations

References

External links

"The Merikins", SocaWarriors.com, 14 February 2012.

Slave soldiers
Trinidad and Tobago people of American descent
African-American diaspora in the Caribbean
Fugitive American slaves
Black Loyalists